Wilmot Mountain is a ski area in Kenosha County, Wisconsin. It is located in the community of Wilmot and lies in both the Town of Randall and the village of Salem Lakes, just north of the Illinois border. Located in the southern region of Wisconsin's Kettle Moraine, Wilmot Mountain is the result of glaciation. The self-proclaimed "Matterhorn of the Midwest" was founded by Walter Stopa in 1938 after a thorough research of the area’s topography. It is also one of the few hills where the mountain is wide open, with few trees or barriers to crossing the hill. A skier can transverse several runs while skiing downhill. Night skiing is available on the entire hill.

The Stopa Family were the owners and operators from February 1938 to January 2016. Vail Resorts purchased the resort in early 2016 and completed about $13 million in renovations in the same year. Most days small aircraft from the nearby Westosha airport can be seen high above, circling the hill.

Winter Sports - Skiing, Snowboarding, and Snow Tubing

Recreational

Wilmot Mountain caters to skiers, snowboarders, and snow tubers. 

A new lodge houses the ticket sales, food and beverage options, rental items, conference rooms, and banquet facilities. Wilmot Mountain's Snow Tubing Area was built at a separate area so it does not take away from the existing skiing and snowboarding runs.

The longest ski & snowboard run, State Line, parallels the Illinois / Wisconsin border - a small section near the top is in Illinois. The terrain park at Wilmot Mountain has a full combination of beginner to advanced boxes, rails and jibbing features.

Wilmot Mountain has a full service ski and snowboard school with over 300 certified instructors and a comprehensive children's program. It also has an award winning National Ski Patrol group.

Alpine racing
Wilmot has an active race program and is the destination of many race clubs and groups. Weekly race training is run in the evenings by their on-site race program. The Chicago Metropolitan Ski Council (CMSC) holds Slalom or Giant Slalom races eight days each season using two newly contoured runs designed with racing in mind. NASTAR races were held weekly until 2004.  In 2017, NASTAR racing returned to Wilmot Mountain.

Snowmaking
Wilmot started making their own snow in 1952 using Joe Tropiano snow machines, basically a lawn watering device with heaters to prevent freezing.  Today they use a combination of older and new, high-tech snow making equipment. Wilmot makes snow whenever the temperature drops low enough, even during hours of operation.

History
 In 1938, Walter Stopa bought property from a local farmer and founded Wilmot Hills. He started off with a rope tow, which was powered by the drive mechanism from a Model A Ford.
 In 1968, Walter added the first Wilmot chairlift. Walter died on June 10, 1986, and his daughter Diane Reese and son-in-law Micheal Reese took over as owner and general manager.
 In 1989, Diane, and Micheal added the Iron Kettle dining facility.
 In 2001, Dennis Sheen, Diane's son in-law, took charge as general manager.
 In 2011, Snow Tubing was added to Wilmot Mountain lineup.
 In January 2016, Diane Reese sold Wilmot Mountain to Vail Resorts.
 In March 2016, Taylor Ogilive became the general manager for Wilmot Mountain.
 In summer of 2016, Vail Resorts invested more than $13 million in renovations.

Auto racing
The roads surrounding the parking lot and resort have a very unusual shape, including a hairpin curve.  The design resembles a race track oval, and with good reason - there used to be a race course on the grounds.  From 1954 to 1967, the ski resort was home to Wilmot Hills Race Course. In the summer months the ski lodge served food and drinks to race fans. Aerial photos of the area clearly show the race track, although part of the course is now covered by building additions.

Facilities
The resort has several cafeterias, 2 pubs, pizza restaurant, ski shop, rentals and lockers. Nearby Wilmot and Antioch also offer a selection of restaurants and accommodations.

Notable facts
In January 2016, Wilmot Mountain was sold to Vail Resorts for $14 million.
Wilmot’s Ski School was founded in 1939 by Helmut Teichner 
Gander Mountain was founded in Wilmot
Exhibition Run was re-contoured in the mid-1980s and a large boulder removed
75% of Wilmot's income is from the Tubing Facility
Lights installed for night skiing in 1955 (It was such a novelty that The Tonight Show featured it)
Multiple Junior Olympic Medal winners have skied for the Wilmot Mountain Junior Race Team
Previous assets, tables, chairs, lights, and lamps were distributed equally to the Sheen/Stopa/Reese Family.
Walt Stopa Retires in 1960, With Diane Reese takes the CEO and Manager Position. Micheal Reese takes the General Manager Position in 1974. Micheal Reese is fired and in 2001 Dennis Sheen takes the Manager Position. In 2015, After 55 Years, Diane Reese steps down from CEO, and Robert A. Katz takes CEO position (via Vail Resorts sale). In 2017, General Manager, Dennis Sheen is replaced by Taylor Ogilive.
No Renovations were made to the Tubing Facility, other than the sign change. As it was built in 2011, and no renovations are needed.

Location
Wilmot Mountain is located at coordinates , just 1/2 mile south of Wilmot, Wisconsin.

References

External links

 
 Area Snow Conditions
 Area History
 DH Ski racing site, thousands of photos, mostly of Wilmot racing
 Virtual tour of the mountain
 Comprehensive history of Wilmot Mountain
 Wilmot Hills Auto Race history
 Wisconsin's site for area recreation with some information on Wilmot Mountain
 Some history on the SciFi cons at Wilmot
 Wilmot Mountain Race Program Website
 Wilmot Mountain Ski Patrol Website
 Wilmot Mountain Terrain Park on Myspace

Geography of Kenosha County, Wisconsin
Ski areas and resorts in Wisconsin
Buildings and structures in Kenosha County, Wisconsin